Polish Cemetery in Tehran is a historical cemetery situated in the eastern suburbs of Tehran, Iran, part of Doulab Christian Cemetery of Tehran. It was made during Evacuation of Polish civilians from the USSR in World War II. This cemetery contains the remains of 22,192 graves of the Polish civilians who perished due to sickness during their transport to the Middle East.

Overview
There are two memorials in this cemetery. The first is located in the center of the Polish section, built in honor of the victims of this historic migration, and the other is a stony statue of the Polish White Eagle, with the left of the names of the refugees who drowned in the Caspian Sea, and to the right of it are the names of those buried in the cemeteries of Khorramshahr and Qazvin and in over cemeteries in Iran.

See also
 Polish Cemetery at Monte Cassino
 Polish Military Cemetery at Casamassima

References

External links
 The image of the Polish Cemetery @ Tehran
 The image of the Polish Cemetery @ Tehran

World War II cemeteries
Cemeteries in Tehran
Poland in World War II
Iran–Poland relations